Rousies is a commune in the Nord department in northern France.

It is located south of Maubeuge, on the river Solre.

Heraldry

Attractions
Despite its small size, Rousies does boast a music school.

See also
Communes of the Nord department

References

External links

 Rousies on the site of the national geographical Institute

Communes of Nord (French department)